Laurence Benjamin Saperstein (born April 12, 1998) is an American actor. He stars as Big Red in the Disney+ series High School Musical: The Musical: The Series.

Life and career
Saperstein is from Islip on the southern shore of Long Island, New York. He is Jewish. He has been dancing since he was 6 and was a member of the Tap City Youth Ensemble. He has spent several summers at the Usdan Summer Camp for the Arts. He attended Islip High School and was selected as a 2016 Long Island Scholar Artist. He graduated with a Bachelor of Fine Arts in Production and Design for Stage and Screen from Pace University in New York City in 2020.

Saperstein has been acting since he was 3 years old at a community theater with his parents. Larry landed his first role at the age of 6 as Winthrop Paroo in Star Playhouse's production of The Music Man. He has had several theatre roles in Long Island and touring on the West Coast.

Saperstein played Lucius in the 2015 ABC Television film Fan Girl starring Kiernan Shipka.

In February 2019, it was announced Saperstein would star in his breakout onscreen role in the Disney+ series High School Musical: The Musical: The Series as Big Red, Ricky Bowen (Joshua Bassett)'s best friend who fills in as the school production's stage manager. The series premiered that November. Saperstein was the final main to be cast.

In June 2021, Saperstein came out as bisexual via social media.

Filmography

Stage

References

External links
 
 

Living people
1998 births
21st-century American male actors
American male child actors
American male film actors
American male stage actors
American male television actors
Jewish American male actors
Male actors from New York (state)
Pace University alumni
People from Islip (town), New York
Bisexual male actors
LGBT Jews
21st-century American Jews
American bisexual actors